Tears of Mankind is a death/doom metal band from Surgut, Russia.

Biography 
The project is formed in 2002, in Surgut, the unique participant Skobelin Phillip. In the further onemanband plays style gothic-doom-death and in 2002 writes down the first demo "Tears of Mankind".

In 2005 the contract with label Stygian Crypt Prod subscribes on the edition of the first album. In 2006 the release "Without Ray Of Hope" which was the collection of tracks from a demo-albums took place: "Where Angels Do Not Dare To Fly", "Deep Inside The Silence" and "For My Last Pray".

In December of the same year there is a second album "To Solitude …", for the first time with Russian-speaking lyrics (by Sergey "Solitude" Terentyev) on BadMoodMan (Solitude Prod). Now Tears of Mankind acts in live with sessional musicians from Surgut group N.O.S.P.A. (death-metal) in which Phillip itself accepts active participation since 1996.

Line-Up

Studio line-up 
 Phillip "Phil" Skobelin - vocal, guitar, bass, samples

On Live Line-up 
 Phillip "Phil" Skobelin - vocal
 Andrey Berkut - guitar
 Alexander "Hanemann" Davidov - guitar
 Dmitry Rubanov - bass

Discography 
 2002 Tears of Mankind (Demo)
 2002 Feast (Demo)
 2003 Silence (Demo)
 2003 Moenchsgesang (Demo)
 2003 Where Angels Do Not Dare To Fly (Demo)
 2004 Deep Inside The Silence (Demo)
 2004 To Nowhere (Demo)
 2004 For My Last Pray (Demo)
 2005 Pulse (Demo)
 2005 Unique (Demo)
 2005 Dark Times (Demo)
 2006 Without Ray Of Hope (Stygian Crypt)
 2006 To Solitude… (BadMoodMan)
 2008 Silent Veil Of My Doom (Solitude Productions)
 2011 Memoria (Solitude Productions)

Russian heavy metal musical groups
Russian death metal musical groups
Doom metal musical groups
Musical groups established in 2002
2002 establishments in Russia